Blockade is a 1938 American drama film directed by William Dieterle and starring Madeleine Carroll, Henry Fonda, and Leo Carrillo.

Premise
During the Spanish Civil War a farmer takes up arms to fight for the Republican side.

Cast
 Madeleine Carroll as Norma
 Henry Fonda as Marco
 Leo Carrillo as Luis
 John Halliday as Andre Gallinet
 Vladimir Sokoloff as Basil
 Robert Warwick as General Vallejo
 Reginald Denny as Edward Grant
 Peter Godfrey as Magician
 Fred Kohler as Pietro
 Carlos De Valdez as Major del Rio
 Nick Thompson as Seppo
 William B. Davidson as Commandant
 Katherine DeMille as Cabaret Girl

Release
The film had a loss of $135,672.

References

External links

1938 films
Spanish Civil War films
Films directed by William Dieterle
Films produced by Walter Wanger
American black-and-white films
American war drama films
1930s war drama films
1938 drama films
Films scored by Werner Janssen
1930s English-language films
1930s American films